Bellevue Historic District may refer to:

in the United States
(by state)
 Bellevue Historic District (Bellevue, Idaho), listed on the NRHP in Idaho
Bellevue Avenue Historic District, Newport, RI, listed on the NRHP in Rhode Island
Bellevue Avenue/Casino Historic District, Newport, RI, listed on the NRHP in Rhode Island
 Bellevue Historic District (Columbia, South Carolina), listed on the NRHP in South Carolina
Bellevue Rural Historic District, Forest, VA, listed on the NRHP in Virginia

See also
Bellevue (disambiguation)